The HAL Tejas is an Indian, single engine, delta wing, light multirole fighter designed by the Aeronautical Development Agency (ADA) in collaboration with Aircraft Research and Design Centre (ARDC) of Hindustan Aeronautics Limited (HAL) for the Indian Air Force and Indian Navy. It was developed from the Light Combat Aircraft (LCA) programme, which began in the 1980s to replace India's ageing MiG-21 fighters but later became part of a general fleet modernisation programme. In 2003, the LCA was officially named "Tejas". It is the smallest and lightest in its class of contemporary supersonic combat aircraft.

The Tejas is the second fighter developed by HAL with the intention of supersonic performance, after the HAL HF-24 Marut. The Tejas achieved initial operational clearance in 2011 and final operational clearance in 2019. The first Tejas squadron became operational in 2016, as No. 45 Squadron IAF Flying Daggers was the first to have their MiG-21s replaced with the Tejas.

The Tejas currently has three production models – Tejas Mark 1, Mark 1A and trainer. The IAF has ordered 40 Tejas Mark 1, 73 Tejas Mark 1A and 10 trainer aircraft. The IAF plans to procure 324 aircraft in all variants, including the Tejas Mark 2 currently under development. The Tejas Mark 2 is expected to be ready for series production by 2026.

 indigenous content in the Tejas Mark 1 is 59.7% by value and 75.5% by number of line replaceable units. The indigenous content of the Tejas Mk 1A is expected to be 50% and rise to 60% by the end of the programme.

Development

LCA programme

The LCA programme originated in the early 1980s. In 1983, the Government of India established the LCA project with the initial goal to develop a new light combat aircraft to replace the ageing IAF fighters, especially the MiG-21 variants, which had been the mainstay of the IAF since 1963. At one point the IAF had operated as many as 874 MiG-21s. The "Long Term Re-Equipment Plan 1981" noted that most of these IAF fighters were approaching the end of their service lives by the early-1990s, and that by 1995, the IAF would be 40 percent short of the aircraft needed to fill its projected force structure requirements.

In 1984, the Government of India established Aeronautical Development Agency (ADA) under the aegis of Defence Research and Development Organisation (DRDO) to manage the LCA programme. The ADA was entrusted with the design and development of LCA while HAL was chosen as the principal contractor. The government's "self-reliance" goals for the LCA included the three most sophisticated and challenging systems: the Fly-by-wire (FBW) flight control system, multi-mode pulse-doppler radar, and afterburning turbofan engine.

The project definition phase was commenced in October 1986 with France's Dassault-Breguet Aviation as consultant. Dassault-Breguet's expertise was mainly utilised in the design and system integration of the Tejas. In 1988, Dassault offered a hybrid fly by wire flight control system for the LCA, consisting of three digital channels and one analogue channel, with a redundant analogue channel as a back up in case the digital channels fails. But the ADA was in favour of a quadruplex digital FBW flight control system.

The design of the Tejas was finalised in 1990, as a small tailless compound delta wing design with relaxed static stability. To provide enhanced manoeuvrability it would be a control configured vehicle incorporating a digital FBW flight control system. Kota Harinarayana was the Programme Director and Chief Designer of Tejas. In 1992, a dedicated National Control Law (CLAW) team was set up by the National Aerospace Laboratories to develop India's own state of the art FBW flight control system for the Tejas. According to FlightGlobal, Lockheed Martin's consultancy was sought earlier, but following a US embargo in response to India's second nuclear tests in 1998, India was forced to complete the software independently. This delayed the programme partly by about 18 months.

The CLAW team completed the design and integration of the flight control laws with the flight control system software, with the aid of an Iron Bird test rig. The quadruplex digital fly-by-wire flight control system conducted over 50 hours of pilot testing on Technology Demonstrator TD-1. On 4 January 2001, on its maiden flight, the TD-1 successfully flew with an indigenous quadruplex digital FBW flight control system.

Another critical technology needed for LCA was the multi-mode radar (MMR). Initially, the Ericsson/Ferranti PS-05/A I/J-band multi-function radar, also used on Saab's JAS 39 Gripen, was intended to be used. However, DRDO decided to develop an indigenous multi-mode radar for the Tejas. HAL's Hyderabad division and the DRDO's Electronics and Radar Development Establishment (LRDE) laboratory were selected to jointly lead the MMR programme, and work commenced in 1997. The Centre for Airborne Systems (CABS) was responsible for the MMR's test programme. An HAL-748 airborne surveillance aircraft was converted for this purpose. The development of multi-mode was not smooth, as it suffered some setbacks. By 2005, only two radar modes – the air-to-air look-up and look-down were confirmed to have been successfully tested. The performance of several other modes that had been tested were suboptimal. The problem with the radar was mainly attributed to the lack of compatibility between the LRDE/HAL multi mode radar and the LRDE's advanced signal processor module. Using an "off-the-shelf" foreign radar as an interim option was considered.

ADA met with success in the development of three of the five key technologies identified at the beginning of the LCA programme. The successful endeavours were mastery in the FBW flight control system, the development and manufacturing of carbon-fibre composite structures and skins, and a modern glass cockpit. The Autolay computer-aided design software developed as part of the LCA programme has been licensed to Airbus for its A380 wide-body aircraft project. The development of a multi-mode pulse-doppler radar, once delayed was completed as the Active electronically scanned array (AESA) radar and is currently undergoing flight trials. India's self-reliance goal oriented development for the LCA programme has considerably increased the indigenous components in Tejas and contributed to an aviation industry expansion in the country.

On 20 December 2021, Ministry of Defence (MoD) in a written reply during winter session of Rajya Sabha clarified that the HAL Tejas is no longer considered as a replacement for the Mikoyan-Gurevich MiG-21, instead it is now part of a general IAF fleet modernisation programme.

Prototypes and testing

Prototype testing began in 2003, a year after the first flight of the second Technology Demonstrator (TD-2). The first prototype aircraft, PV-1, made its maiden flight in 2003. The first trainer prototype PV-5 was rolled out in 2009 and made its first flight on 26 November 2009. A total of two trainer prototypes were built and designated PV-5 and PV-06. The first naval prototype, designated NP-1, made its first flight on 27 April 2012. It was a twin-seater aircraft, while the second naval prototype, designated as NP-2, was a single seater. Both naval prototypes were used extensively for various aircraft carrier-related trials at the Shore Based Test Facility in Goa. NP-2 was used in the actual carrier trials, where it made an arrested recovery and ski-jump assisted take-off from the aircraft-carrier  in January 2020.

The first Limited Series Production aircraft (LSP-1) performed its maiden flight on 25 April 2007. A total of seven limited series production (LSP) aircraft were built. The LSPs were extensively used for developmental trials such as weapon testing – involving test firing of the R-73 and Python-5 close combat missiles, the I-Derby ER beyond visual range air-to-air missile and guided–unguided munition releases. The LSPs were also used for sensor trials involving integration and testing of the Israeli Elta EL/M-2032 multi-mode radar, Indian Uttam AESA Radar and Rafael Litening targeting pod. The Uttam radar was integrated on the Tejas LSP-2 and LSP-3, and logged about 30 hours of flight testing on the Tejas alone. The high altitude trials and hot weather trials were carried out with the LSPs and the PV-3 prototype, in IOC and FOC configurations. These trials were mainly focused on assessing the performance of the various sensors and avionics on board, at temperatures ranging from below -10 degree Celsius to more than +45 degrees Celsius.

Sea trials to assess the radar performance in air-to-air and air-to-sea modes, at various altitudes were carried out in 2010. Flutter vibration tests were also carried out in different configurations at high angles of attack (AoA) to assess the structural integrity across the flight envelope. LSP-4 completed the successful trial of BDL developed Counter Measure Dispensing System (CMDS) with R-73 missile on 2 December 2010. It worked well Open Architecture Mission Computer and Digital Stores Management System.

In the second half of 2012, the Tejas fleet was grounded for over three months and the ejection system had to be modified to resume flight tests by the end of 2012. In 2013, Tejas (LSP-7) conducted an inflight engine relight test at high altitude to assess the engine response on flameout, a critical parameter for operational clearance. The inflight engine relight test is crucial for single engine combat aircraft.

Operational clearance

In December 2006, the IAF announced that it would form an "LCA Induction Team" to manage the aircraft's service introduction. The Tejas was awarded initial operational clearance-I (IOC-I) in January 2011. To ease up the process of FOC, an interim IOC-II was issued to Tejas in December 2013. The IOC-II expanded the g-limit, angle of attack and allowed the aircraft to carry precision guided munitions and close combat missiles. The IOC-II Tejas have an operational radius of 400–500 km. The first squadron, consisting of Tejas in IOC-II configuration, became operational in 2016. The No. 45 Squadron IAF based at Sulur Air Force Station, Coimbatore was the first to have their MiG-21s replaced by Tejas aircraft at the base.

The FOC campaign began in December 2014. Two critical parameters set by IAF for FOC clearance was expansion of angle of attack from 24 degree in IOC-II to 28 degree in FOC and inflight refueling capability. In February 2018, as part of the FOC campaign, the Tejas carried out a "hot refuelling" - refuelling with engine running, which shortens the turnaround time by 30% and doubles the sortie rate. In September 2018, the Tejas successfully completed its mid-air refuelling trials required for the aircraft to obtain its FOC. In January 2019, HAL received permission from CEMILAC to start production of the FOC standard Tejas.

On 20 February 2019, during the Aero India 2019 show, FOC was formally awarded to the Tejas. The second Tejas squadron – No.18 Flying Bullets was formed at Sulur Air Force Station on 27 May 2020 with the first four serial production FOC aircraft.

A full mission simulator (FMS) phase-1 was commissioned at Sulur Air Force Station on 23 October 2021. The Phase 1 of the FMS features training in aircraft handling and full envelope flying. Phase 2 will further augment the training with focus on weapons system and advance sensors onboard Tejas.

Upgrades and further development 

In May 2015, the Comptroller and Auditor General of India (CAG) noted some shortcomings in the then-delivered Tejas Mark 1 IOC standard aircraft, which according to the CAG would limit the survivability and operational deployability of the aircraft in actual combat.  A few of these shortcomings, including lack of combat endurance, were addressed in the Tejas Mark 1 FOC configuration aircraft. Tejas Mark 1 FOC resolved the issue of onboard fuel monitoring with an integrated Environmental Control and Fuel Management (ECFM) system. It can now perform aerial refueling from Ilyushin Il-78 and buddy refueling with Sukhoi Su-30MKI. Tejas is also undergoing butt firing trials and air-to-air firing at HAL, Nashik facility with Gryazev-Shipunov GSh-23.

The shortcomings, such as the increased weight and reduced speed would be addressed in the upcoming Tejas Mark 1A aircraft by increasing the use of composites in manufacturing and reducing the supersonic drag by using more aerodynamic pylons. The MK1A will also have AESA radar, a self-protection jammer, updated avionics and electronic warfare capabilities, among other improvements. The shortcomings identified by CAG that require redesign and structural modification such as increasing internal fuel capacity, are planned to be rectified in the Tejas Mark 2.

Tejas Mark 1A 
The Tejas Mark 1A, which has more than 40 improvements over the Mark 1 variant, is expected to begin production in 2023–24. Upgraded Mark 1A aircraft will retain basic Mark 1 airframe while featuring a new avionic suite centered on EL/M-2052 AESA Radar and Uttam AESA Radar, DARE Unified Electronic Warfare Suite (UEWS), an externally mounted self protection jammer (SPJ) for enhanced survivability, instrument flight rules (IFR) capability, Onboard Oxygen Generation System (OBOGS) developed by Defence Bioengineering and Electromedical Laboratory (DEBEL) for endurance and an expanded weapon suite consisting of Astra BVRAAM and ASRAAM. HAL will install in-house developed Combined Interrogator and Transponder (CIT) with digital map generator by Mission and Combat Systems R&D Centre which helps transfer the required mission map on pilot display, an upgraded IFF+ from older identification friend or foe system. To better accommodate the pilots, cockpit floor is also reshaped. The upgraded Tejas Mark 1A will have a reduced turnaround time.

According to HAL Chairman and Director R Madhavan, the design activity of Tejas Mark 1A is moving ahead and the testing of subsystems will be completed by 2021. The taxi trials will commence in the first half of 2022 and the first flight of Mark 1A prototype will happen in second half of 2022. Delivery of the aircraft for the IAF will begin from March 2024. BEL will supply 20 types of locally developed critical avionics and upgrades such as Digital Flight Control Computers from ADA, Air Data Computer from DRDO, Weapon Computers from ADE, Radar Warning Receiver from Combat Aircraft Systems Development and Integration Centre (CASDIC) and Head-up display from Central Scientific Instruments Organisation (CSIO) from 2023 to 2028 for ₹2,400 crore.

On 20 June 2022, the Tejas Mark 1A prototype completed its first flight. HAL intends to obtain a certificate from Centre for Military Airworthiness and Certification (CEMILAC) within 30 months before this version enters mass production. Two ASRAAMs are intended for use on Tejas Mark 1A. The production variant will come equipped with dual-rack pylons with weapon systems integration. HAL is on track to deliver first Tejas Mark 1A by February 2024.The order of 83 aircraft for IAF will be completed by 2029 at the rate of 16 units per year.

Tejas Mark 2 

The HAL Tejas design has been further developed into the Tejas Mark 2, incorporating a more powerful General Electric F414 INS6 engine, canards and other design changes. The Tejas Mark 2, which is expected to be rolled out in 2022, will have an increased payload carrying capacity and internal fuel capacity, more external hardpoints, improved combat range, a completely redesigned cockpit, and an integrated infrared search and track (IRST) system, in addition to the AESA radar. The Defence Institute of Advanced Technology (DIAT) is developing aircraft health and usage monitoring systems (HUMS) to integrate the various sensors on board the Tejas Mark 2. The first flight of Tejas Mark 2 is expected to be in 2023.

Naval variant

The Naval LCA programme was commenced in 2003. According to ADA, the Naval LCA (N-LCA) Programme was envisaged to be completed in two phases, under Phase-1 two naval prototypes were developed - the two-seat NP-1 and the single-seat NP-2, based on the Tejas Mark 1 design, to carryout carrier suitability certification and weapons integration. Under Phase 2, two single-seat prototypes were planned to be built, based on the Tejas Mark 2 design, with further design optimisation and integration of the General Electric F414 INS6 engine. The first naval prototype NP-1 was rolled out in July 2010, and made its first flight on 27 April 2012. The naval LCA has stronger landing gear to absorb the forces generated during carrier take off and arrested recovery.

In December 2014, the LCA Navy successfully made its first ski-jump assisted take off from a SBTF at INS Hansa. The navy variant has a distinctive flight control law mode which allows hands-free take-off.

In December 2016, the Indian Navy (IN) opted out of the programme, owing to the long delay and technical reasons – such as inadequate thrust to weight ratio of N-LCA for carrier based combat operations, and issued a fresh RFI for the procurement of 57 multi-role carrier borne fighters.

Because the technologies developed for the Tejas programme will be carried over to other platforms currently being developed by the ADA, test flying was continued.

In 2019, an LCA navy prototype successfully carried out the first arrested landing at the SBTF in Goa in day time and night time. As of December 2019, the Naval LCA programme completed 209 test flights, of these 50 were ski jump take-offs.

In January 2020, the naval prototype NP-2 successfully carried out its first arrested landing and ski-jump assisted take-off from the aircraft-carrier INS Vikramaditya.

In July 2020, the DRDO announced that the plan to develop an LCA Mark 2 Navy had been dropped and they were working on a new carrier-borne fighter according to the Indian Navy's multi-role carrier borne fighter requirement floated in 2016 to replace the current fleet of MIG-29K/KUB carrier-based fighters. In Aero India 2021 a new twin engine naval fighter was unveiled, the Twin Engine Deck Based Fighter (TEDBF). The experience gained in the N-LCA programme will help in the development of TEDBF.

In February 2023, the naval prototype completed its maiden landing and take-off from the indigenous aircraft carrier INS Vikrant.

Program costs

Development costs
 LCA Programme -  (up to March 2020)
 Kaveri engine programme - 
  additional design and development (Jan 2021)

Flyaway costs
  for IOC Mark 1 (2014)
  for FOC Mark 1 (2010)

Design

Overview
The Tejas is a single-engine multirole combat aircraft which has a tailless, compound delta wing design with "relaxed static stability" for enhanced manoeuvrability and agility. The Tejas is a multi-role combat aircraft and its flexibility permits it to carry out Interception, air-to-surface and anti-shipping roles in a single mission. The wind tunnel testing and computational fluid dynamics analysis have optimised the design of Tejas for minimum transonic and supersonic wave drag, as well low wing-loading.

Tejas has eight hardpoints – one beneath the port-side air-intake, one under the fuselage (centreline station) and three hardpoints under each wing, of these, three are wet hardpoints which can carry drop tanks. The hardpoint beneath the port side air-intake is dedicated to carrying sensor pods such as FLIR, IRST or laser rangefinder/designator. These can also be carried on the centreline pylon and inboard pairs of wing stations. The Mark 1A has an aerial refuelling probe on the starboard side of the forward fuselage. The Tejas weapon suite consists of I-Derby ER and Astra beyond visual range air-to-air missiles and R-73, Python-5 and ASRAAM close combat missiles. The Tejas has an internal 23 mm Gryazev-Shipunov GSh-23 twin-barreled autocannon under the starboard side air-intake. The BrahMos-NG supersonic cruise missile is being developed for the Tejas.

The relatively smaller size, extensive use of airframe composites, the Y-duct inlet which shields the engine compressor blades, the application of radar-absorbent material (RAM) coatings and so on, reduces the overall radar cross-section of the aircraft.

Airframe
Apart from aluminium-lithium alloys and titanium alloys, carbon-fibre composite materials are used in the construction of the Tejas. The composite materials constitute 45% of the airframe by weight and 90% by surface area, the highest among contemporary aircraft. The upper and lower wing surfaces, wing spars and wing ribs are also made out of carbon-fibre composites, while the fin tip is made out of glass-fibre. The extensive use of composite materials in the airframe not only makes the aircraft lighter but also gives high strength. This also reduces the number of joints or rivets, increases the aircraft's structural integrity and lowers its susceptibility to fatigue cracks. The tailfin is a monolithic honeycomb structure, reducing the manufacturing cost by 80% compared to traditional methods. Initially the Tejas prototypes were equipped with a radome made out of Kevlar which was replaced with a quartz radome in the production aircraft.

The naval LCA has a nose droop to provide improved view for carrier landings. In addition to the elevons, the naval LCA have wing leading–edge vortex controllers (LEVCON) control surfaces that extend from the wing-root leading edge, which could be deflected to a downward angle or an upward angle to increase lift and reduce airspeed during approach. The LEVCONs also provides better low-speed handling and increase controllability at high angles of attack (AoA).  The naval Tejas also has a strengthened undercarriage, stronger landing gear, and an arrestor hook system for carrier landings. The two-seat LCA Navy variant (NP-1) have aerodynamic commonality with the trainer variant.

Avionics

The avionics of the Tejas Mark 1 is centered around Elta EL/M-2032 radar. Its digital flight control computer developed by ADE and manufactured BEL. It has an electronic warfare (EW) suite domestically developed by Defence Avionics Research Establishment (DARE), which consists of a radar warning receiver (RWR), integrated self-protection jammer, chaff and flare dispenser system. The upgraded variant of the Tejas Mark 1, named the Tejas Mark 1A, will have an AESA radar, new digital flight control computer, new EW suite and updated avionics. Some of the production Mark 1A fighters will be equipped with the Elta EL/M-2052 AESA radar, while rest are expected to fly with the domestically developed Uttam AESA radar. The new EW system for the Mark 1A, developed by DARE and known as the Unified Electronic Warfare suite (UEWS), will have electronic countermeasures and electronic counter-countermeasure capabilities, digital radio frequency memory based jamming and deception capabilities. The Tejas Mark 1A will also carry a pod-mounted self-protection jammer – the Elta ELL-8222WB. The Mark 1A will have software-defined radio-based secure communications and network-centric warfare capabilities.

The Tejas can also carry pod-based sensors such as forward looking infrared (FLIR). Currently the Tejas is cleared to carry the Rafael Litening III targeting/reconnaissance pod, while an advanced version named Litening 4I will be integrated on the Tejas. The Litening 4I pod, developed by the C4I systems division of Rafael, enables the aircraft to carry out reconnaissance, surveillance and intelligence gathering, in addition to target acquisition. The Tejas has an integrated health-monitoring system.

The Tejas has a night vision goggles compatible glass cockpit, equipped with a domestically developed head-up display (HUD), three multi-function displays, two Smart Standby Displays by Central Scientific Instruments Organization (CSIO). The Tejas has hands-on-throttle-and-stick (HOTAS) arrangement to reduce pilot's workload. The displays provide key information on a need-to-know basis, the pilot interacts with onboard systems through a multi-functional keyboard and several selection panels. The Tejas has a "get-you-home" panel coupled with an air data computer developed by Bharat Electronics Limited to assist the pilot in case of an emergency. The cockpit is equipped with Martin-Baker 16LG zero-zero ejection seat and canopy severance system developed by the DRDO for safe ejection. For life support, Tejas Mark 1 relies on conventional liquid oxygen LOX system, while an onboard oxygen-generation system (OBOGS) has been developed for Tejas Mark 1A. The ADA has developed virtual reality assisted cockpit simulator for Tejas, and N-LCA. Currently Tejas pilots are flying with Elbit DASH IV helmet-mounted display system.

Flight control system

The aerodynamic configuration of Tejas is based on a delta-wing layout with shoulder-mounted wings. The control surfaces include three-section slats on the wing's outer leading edge while the inboard sections of the wings have additional slats to generate vortex lift over the inner wing and high-energy air-flow along the tail fin to enhance high-AoA stability. The wing trailing edge fits two-segment elevons to provide pitch and roll control. The only empennage-mounted control surfaces are the single-piece rudder and two airbrakes, located in the upper rear part of the fuselage, one each on either side of the fin. Since the Tejas is a relaxed static stability design, it is equipped with a NAL-developed full authority quadruplex digital fly-by-wire flight control system and an open architecture digital flight control computer developed by BEL.  Its flight control surfaces are controlled by hybrid electro-hydraulic actuators through the digital flight control computer. The fly-by-wire flight control system of the Tejas has an advanced feature called auto low-speed recovery. This enables envelope protection at low speed and high angles of attack. It prevents the aircraft from entering into uncontrolled flight while maneuvering. Another feature is disorientation recovery function, once engaged it will recover the aircraft to an optimal altitude, airspeed and level flight. Some of the flight control laws for these features were formulated by the IIT Bombay research university.

Propulsion

Developing an indigenous jet engine for Tejas was one of the five self-reliance goals identified at the beginning of the LCA Programme. A programme led by the Gas Turbine Research Establishment (GTRE) to design and develop an indigenous powerplant, the Kaveri, was launched as early as in 1986. However Kaveri jet engine development faced some setbacks, hence the General Electric F404-GE-F2J3 afterburning turbofan engine was procured as an interim solution. Since 2004, uprated General Electric F404-GE-IN20 engines are powering Tejas variants.

The Tejas Mark 1 is currently powered by the F404 IN20 engine. The Mark 1A variant will be powered by the same powerplant, while the heavier Tejas Mark 2 will be powered by a General Electric F414 INS6 engine.

Operational history

The formation of the first Tejas-equipped squadron started in July 2011. The first Tejas squadron—No. 45 Squadron IAF (Flying Daggers) became operational in July 2016, based at Sulur Air Force Station in Coimbatore. The second Tejas Mark 1 squadron, Squadron 18, was formed at Sulur on 27 May 2020. The Tejas Mark 1 made its international debut on 21 January 2016, at the fourth Bahrain International Airshow.

In April 2018, the IAF's entire fleet of Tejas Mark 1 aircraft participated in the Gagan Shakti 2018 exercise. It was the IAF's largest air exercise, involving 1,100 aircraft and 15,000 military personnel. During the exercise, the Tejas were deployed to forward bases and demonstrated their reliability and precision strike capability. In 2019, six Tejas fighter jets participated in the Vayu Shakti air exercise, where it has demonstrated its "swing role" capability.

According to the commanding officer of No. 45 Squadron – Group Captain Samrath Dhankhar, DASH IV HMDS enables the Tejas pilot to take full advantage of high off-boresight close combat missiles, such as – Python-5 and R-73.

On 18 August 2020, IAF deployed the No. 45 Squadron "Flying Dagger" on the western front along the Pakistani border (line of control). It was the first operational deployment of Tejas.

On 27 April 2021, Tejas Mark 1 successfully test fired Python-5 high off-boresight (HOBS) close combat missile and further validated enhanced capability of I-Derby ER (extended range) BVR missile. Both missiles scored direct hits on targets during the trial.

Potential operators
HAL proposed exporting the Tejas, with preliminary talks taking place with several friendly countries. It was reported in March 2020 that HAL is willing to set up logistic facilities in Indonesia, Malaysia, Sri Lanka and Vietnam as part of exporting the Tejas.

Botswana
The Botswana Defence Force Air Wing has approached HAL for potentially replacing Canadair CF-5s with the Tejas due to its age and problems of acquiring needed parts for maintenance. The BDFAW has previously considered acquiring Gripens, the F-16, KAI T-50, and the Leonardo M-346.

Egypt
During the Dubai Airshow 2021, Egyptian officials expressed their interest in procuring 70 LCA Tejas to replace their 100 Chinese-made Hongdu JL-8 trainers. Following the Dubai Airshow 2021, HAL and Indian Air Force officials visited Cairo and discussions were going on. As of June 2022, India has offered to set up local production facilities for the LCA Tejas and also for the Light Utility and Light Combat Helicopters in Egypt.

In Aero India 2023, it was reported that Egypt is seeking around 20 Tejas for its requirements.

United Arab Emirates
The Tejas has attracted interest from the United Arab Emirates (UAE), with some discussions held during a visit by UAE Minister of State and Defence, Mohammed Ahmed Al Bowardi Al Falacy, during a state visit in October 2018, as part of growing defence relations between India and UAE. Although as of May 2022, Tejas failed to gain any interest.

United States
In December 2020, in response to a Request for Information (RFI) from the United States Naval Air Systems Command (NAVAIR), HAL offered the "Lead In Fighter Trainer" variant of the HAL Tejas — classified as the "HAL Tejas LIFT", to the United States Navy (USN), as part the latter's initiative to replace its fleet of T-45 Goshawk trainer aircraft, dubbed the "Undergraduate Jet Training System". Other aircraft participating in the UJTS, are the T-7 Red Hawk — offered by Boeing in partnership with Saab, and the KAI T-50A Golden Eagle — offered by Korea Aerospace Industries (KAI), in partnership with Lockheed Martin.

Despite being the only aircraft among the three to be reportedly capable of undertaking operations from an aircraft carrier, the prospects of the USN selecting the HAL Tejas LIFT are reportedly slim, according to multiple sources. Several reasons suggested as the cause of the LIFT's bleak prospects in the UJTS are that HAL has refrained from partnering with a US-based company to offer the LIFT (unlike the consortiums of Boeing-Saab and KAI-Lockheed Martin, offering the T-7 and the T-50A, respectively), a lack of export orders for the type, and its delta-wing design — which makes it less-suitable for low-speed landing.

Failed bids

Argentina 
The Argentine Air Force (FAA) has periodically indicated its interest in possibly purchasing the HAL Tejas, as part of its modernization initiative. In October 2021, FAA chief-of-staff Brigadier Xavier Julian Isaac confirmed that HAL had offered the HAL Tejas to the FAA, amidst other offers of the JF-17 from China and the MiG-35 from Russia. Multiple sources have also indicated that the HAL Tejas may likely be a good option for the FAA.

However, any potential sale of the HAL Tejas to Argentina may likely be threatened by UK-imposed arms sanctions; the United Kingdom has barred any sale of military-equipment consisting of UK-manufactured parts to Argentina, ever since the British-Argentine Falklands War of 1982. Argentina's earlier efforts to procure other fighter aircraft, including the Mirage F1M, the IAI Kfir, the JAS 39 Gripen and the KAI FA-50 were scuttled due to UK-diplomatic pressure, since the aforementioned aircraft were found to contain UK-origin parts.

Given the nature of the Argentine-specific sanctions, the HAL Tejas would essentially be subject to UK-scrutiny, since it utilizes the British-origin MK16 IN16 GS Tejas ejection seat manufactured by Martin-Baker, along with other British-origin components — including an aerial-refueling probe and a quartz radome, both supplied by Cobham Limited. Nevertheless, HAL has reportedly offered a customised-variant of the HAL Tejas to the FAA, which includes a retrofit of about 50-specific components and the substitution of all major British-origin components — including the ejection seat and the aerial-refueling probe, with diplomatically suitable alternatives; however, any customisation to the HAL Tejas would encompass considerable changes to the aircraft's design and additional flight certification.

On September 21, 2022, there was an indication that the Argentine Air Force was willing to look at the JF-17 because of concerns that the time and money required to modify the Tejas to remove non-British parts was beyond what Buenos Aires was willing to spend. Furthermore, Tejas uses American engines, Israeli radar, and a mishmash of avionics from countries that will never authorize re-export. 

In December 2022, the Argentine government decided to abandon the decision to acquire new fighter aircraft. With President Alberto Fernandez stating in an interview that “Argentina has to allocate its resources to more important things than the purchase of military aircraft. We are in a very unequal continent, but there are no war problems and unity among countries is sought."

Australia
In July 2020, the Royal Australian Air Force (RAAF) had issued a tender, seeking a new jet trainer to replace its fleet of BAE Hawk 127 trainer aircraft. According to HAL's "58th Annual Report" covering 2020–2021, HAL had offered the HAL Tejas in its "Lead in Fighter Trainer" (LIFT) configuration to Australia's Department of Defence (DoD) in July 2020. Other aircraft also reported to be participating in the tender are the Boeing-Saab T-7 Red Hawk, the Aermacchi M-346 Master and the KAI T-50.

However, the Australian Government rejected a government to government deal proposed by the Indian government for 35 Tejas LIFT aircraft for US $1 billion. During bilateral defence talks held in September 2021, The Indian Express reported Australia's lack of interest in the offer.

In February 2022, the Australian government decided to take up a proposal by BAE to upgrade and refurbish its Hawks with new engines and avionics, extending their lifespan until 2032.

Malaysia
Malaysia has frequently indicated that it may be interested in purchasing the HAL Tejas for the Royal Malaysian Air Force (RMAF), as part of its attempts to supplement its MiG-29 fleet; reports of Malaysian interest in procuring the aircraft date back to as early as 2019.

In March 2019, the HAL Tejas made its international debut at the Langkawi International Maritime and Aerospace Exhibition (LIMA); its presence reportedly generated a great deal of interest, especially amongst the RMAF and then-Malaysian PM Mahathir bin Mohamad.

However, in mid-2019, HAL's prospects of exporting the HAL Tejas to Malaysia were severely blemished, owing to diplomatic tussles between India and Malaysia — most particularly Malaysia's contentious remarks over India's abrogation of Article 370 and India's retaliatory move of boycotting Malaysian-produced palm oil. The diplomatic skirmishes ceased in 2020, following Mahathir's resignation as PM and the restitution of the Indo-Malaysian palm oil trade.

In 2021, an RMAF delegation reportedly visited HAL's manufacturing-facility at Bangalore to assess the suitability of the HAL Tejas, possibly in anticipation of a possible order — reaffirming Malaysia's interest in the aircraft.

In June 2021, the RMAF formally released a tender for the supply of 18 light combat-aircraft - dubbed as the "Fighter Lead In Trainer-Light Combat Aircraft" (FLIT/LCA), in an effort to supplant its ageing BAE Hawk 108/208 light-combat aircraft and its MB-339CM trainers. The RMAF later issued a Request for Proposal (RFP) to nine different aircraft-manufacturing conglomerates in July, with a submission-deadline of September 2021 (this would later be extended to October 2021).

In October 2021, the RMAF confirmed that the HAL — offering the HAL Tejas MK1A, had submitted its bid for the FLIT/LCA tender, along with five other international firms — Korea Aerospace Industries (KAI) (offering the KAI FA-50), China National Aero-Technology Import & Export Corporation (CATIC) (offering the HAIC L-15), Leonardo S.p.A. (offering the Aermacchi M-346), Turkish Aerospace Industries (offering the TAI Hürjet) and Rosoboronexport (offering the Mikoyan MiG-35). Coincidentally, the JF-17 — which was reported to be a leading choice for the RMAF, had not participated in the FLIT/LCA tender.

Later that year, HAL signed a Memorandum of Understanding (MoU) with MMTC Ltd — a public sector firm, as a channelizing partner to facilitate the import of palm oil as a counter-trade to any potential sale of the HAL Tejas to the RMAF; this arrangement was initiated to fulfill a mandatory requirement of the RMAF — which stipulates that 50% of the total cost of the FLIT/LCA tender must be paid the winning contender through means of barter trade. HAL also signed another MOU with Boustead Heavy Industries Corporation (BHIC) — a major Malaysia-based defense contractor, to fulfill another mandatory condition of the RMAF — stipulating that the winning contender must locally procure at least 30% of products or services from Malaysian companies in the deal; the HAL-BHIC joint venture would offer a provision of "Depot Level Maintenance" i.e. providing reliability, availability, maintainability and supportability (RAMS) to the RMAF, should HAL win the FLIT/LCA tender.

In July 2022, HAL announced that Malaysia has picked the Tejas to potentially replace its MiG-29s as negotiations are in the final stage. However, Tejas later failed to win the contract.

Philippines
In May 2022, India and the Philippines signed an MOU, which mentioned the consideration of purchasing the Tejas and other Indian-made aircraft. On July 7, 2022, the Tejas was dropped from further consideration from the multi-role fighter jet (MRF) project. The F-16V Block 70/72 and the JAS-39 Gripen C/D+ are the main contenders for the Philippine Air Force's MRF project.

Sri Lanka
It has been reported that Sri Lanka has shown interest in purchasing the Tejas to replace its aging fleets of IAI Kfir and Chengdu J-7 aircraft. The programme is for the acquisition of 8 to 12 aircraft and is to be pursued through a government-government basic agreement. In 2021, it was decided to overhaul the Kfirs, instead of buying new aircraft, which would cost around $40 million per unit compared to $49 million in total for overhauling the five Kfirs.

Variants

Prototypes
Aircraft already built and projected models to be built. Model designations, tail numbers and dates of first flight are shown.

Technology Demonstrators (TD)
 TD-1 (KH2001) – 4 January 2001.
 TD-2 (KH2002) – 6 June 2002.
Prototype Vehicles (PV)
 PV-1 (KH2003) – First flight on 25 November 2003.
 PV-2 (KH2004) – First flight on 1 December 2005.
 PV-3 (KH2005) – First flight on 1 December 2006.
 PV-5 (KH-T2009) – First flight on 26 November 2009 – Fighter/Trainer variant.
 PV-6 (KH-T2010) – First flight on 8 November 2014 – Fighter/Trainer variant.
Naval Prototypes (NP)
 NP-1 (KHN-T3001) – Two-seat naval variant for carrier operations. Rolled out in July 2010. NP-1 made its first flight on 27 April 2012.
 NP-2 (NAVY3002) – Single-seat naval variant. First flight on 7 February 2015 with ski-jump take-off and arrested landing required in STOBAR carrier.

Limited Series Production (LSP) aircraft

 LSP-1 (KH2011) – 25 April 2007. This LCA is powered by F404-F2J3 Engine.
 LSP-2 (KH2012) – 16 June 2008. This is the first LCA fitted with F404-IN20 engine.
 LSP-3 (KH2013) – 23 April 2010. The first aircraft to have the Hybrid MMR radar and will be close to the IOC standard.
 LSP-4 (KH2014) – June 2010. The first aircraft that was flown in the (Mark 1) configuration that will be delivered to the Indian Air Force. The aircraft flew with the Hybrid MMR, a Countermeasure Dispensing System, and an identify friend or foe electronic system.
 LSP-5 (KH2015) – 19 November 2010. IOC standard, with all sensors including night lighting in the cockpit, and an auto-pilot.
 LSP-7 (KH2017) – First flight on 9 March 2012.
 LSP-8 (KH2018) – First flight trial completed in March 2013. LSP 8 is the final version upon which production is based.

Production variants

Tejas Mark 1 − Single-seat operational variant for the Indian Air Force. 16 aircraft have been delivered in IOC standard constituting No. 45 Squadron IAF. Delivery of the Tejas Mark 1 in FOC standard has begun and 18 Squadron (Flying Bullets) was equipped with the first aircraft in May 2020. Delivery of balance 15 aircraft to No. 18 Squadron is expected to be completed by September 2021. FOC standard Tejas Mark 1 are BVRAAM capable, with general flight envelope expansion, increased angle of attack, higher g-limit of +9 g, updated avionics and flight control software suite, as well as capable of hot refueling and aerial refueling.
Tejas Trainer - Two-seat operational conversion trainer for the Indian Air Force; also act as LiFT (Lead-in Fighter Trainer) and ground-attack aircraft.
Tejas Mark 1A - an enhanced Tejas Mark 1 equipped with EL/M-2052 and Uttam AESA radar, self-protection jammer, radar warning receiver, as well as being able to mount an external ECM pod. The first Limited Series Production (LSP) aircraft of the Mark.1A variant rolled out in April 2022, and meant to be used as a Flying Testbed (FTB). A second LSP rolled out in late 2022, and shall be used to validate design changes meant to make the Mark.1A variant lighter than the Mark.1, and to optimize weight distribution.

Future developments
SPORT  - Supersonic Omni-Role Trainer (SPORT) aircraft is a two-seater Lead-in Fighter Training (LiFT) aircraft being developed from the LCA Trainer Mark 1 for export purposes as light fighter.
 Tejas Mark 2 - or Medium Weight Fighter, is an enhanced Tejas Mark 1 design which is expected to have a more powerful engine and an increased payload carrying capacity. The Tejas Mark 2 will feature an AESA radar, an on-board oxygen generation system and a built-in electronic warfare suite among other improvements to avionics. In January 2019, Air Chief Marshal Birender Singh Dhanoa said that the IAF has committed to procure twelve squadrons of Tejas Mark 2 aircraft.
Twin-engine deck based fighter (TEDBF) - A new twin-engine carrier based fighter variant, to be developed independently. It is a totally different program based on the requirements of the Indian Navy. The aircraft will operate from INS Vikrant and INS Vishal and is expected to replace the current MiG-29K in service. The Indian Ministry of Defence approved the TEDBF project in June 2020. The aircraft is expected to start flight tests in 2026.
 Omni Role Combat Aircraft (ORCA) - An air force variant of the TEDBF for the Indian Air Force.
 CATS MAX - The main component of HAL Combat Air Teaming System (CATS), CATS MAX will be a twin seater Tejas Mark 1A modified with CATS interface to act as the mothership of CATS components. The CATS MAX is to be crewed by a pilot and a weapon system officer (WSO), with the later controlling the CATS.
 Tejas Trainer - NP-5 based operational conversion trainer for the Indian Navy, with IFR-probe. Indian Navy was reported to be considering HAL's proposal to reestablish a "Carrier Training Squadron" with 18 Naval Tejas, that would be posted on both of India's carriers and additionally serve as point defence interceptors.

Cancelled variants
Tejas Mark 1 Navy - Naval Variant based on HAL Tejas Mark 1 powered by F404 engine. Cancelled in favour of the new twin-engine naval fighter HAL TEDBF.
 Tejas Mark 2 Navy - Proposed naval variant based on the Tejas Mark 2. Cancelled in favour of the HAL TEDBF.
 Tejas Trainer IN - Two-seat operational conversion trainer for the Indian Navy. Cancelled in favour of HAL TEDBF.

Operators 

Indian Air Force – 123 aircraft to be built. 40 Tejas Mark 1 ordered in March 2006 with deliveries beginning in 2016 (16 Mk1 IOC and 16 Mk1 FOC single-seater aircraft, 8 Mk1 FOC twin-seat trainers). 26 inducted by February 2022.

83 aircraft ordered in February 2021 (73 Mk1A single-seater aircraft, 10 Mk1 FOC trainers), to be delivered in 2024-2028 timeframe.
Sulur Air Force Station
No. 45 Squadron (Flying Daggers)
No. 18 Squadron (Flying Bullets)

Specifications (Tejas Mark 1)

See also

References

Citations

Bibliography

External links
 

 Official Government of India Tejas site 

Features and analysis:
 "Flying into the unknown" — A feature by The Hindu on the Tejas test pilots.
 "LCA and Economics" by Sunil Sainis and George Joseph
 "The Light Combat Aircraft Story", by Air Marshal MSD Wollen (Retd).
 The case to support the indigenous LCA programme, by Ashok Parthasarathi and Raman Puri.

Technical:
 An Approach to High AoA Testing of the LCA
 Development Flight Testing of the Tejas Light Combat Aircraft
 LCA Avionics And Weapon System Mission Computer Software Development: A Case Study
 TEJAS The Indian Light Combat Aircraft, official brochure 2015 
 ADA Tejas IOC brochure
 General Electric F404 family turbofan engines datasheet

General:
 "Tejas / Light Combat Aircraft (LCA)", Fighter-planes.com
 "Dawn of Tejas" Aero India special report from flightglobal.com
 Radiance in Indian Skies - The Tejas Saga by Air Marshal P Rajkumar, BR Srikant

Tejas
2000s Indian fighter aircraft
Tailless delta-wing aircraft
Single-engined jet aircraft
Articles containing video clips
Carrier-based aircraft
Aircraft first flown in 2001